"The Six Arms Saga" is a story arc featuring the popular Marvel Comics character Spider-Man, written by Stan Lee and drawn by Gil Kane. It spans the issues The Amazing Spider-Man #100–102 (1971) and features the first appearance and origin story of Morbius, the Living Vampire. The story arc is mostly remembered for Spider-Man growing four extra arms, and for a subsequent What If…? stating that keeping the arms would have allowed Spider-Man to save Gwen Stacy and defeat Thanos himself.

The titular "Six-Arm Spider-Man" will make his cinematic debut in the 2023 feature film Spider-Man: Across the Spider-Verse, as a member of Miguel O'Hara's Spider-Forces.

Plot
Peter Parker has recently experienced a lot of misery in his life: his best friend Harry Osborn has become a junkie, his close friend Captain George Stacy died in his arms, and Gwen Stacy – Peter's girlfriend – wrongly blamed Spider-Man for her father's death. He has a fatal thought: for Peter Parker to live, Spider-Man must die! Peter has been working on a serum to terminate his spider powers ever since he got them, and decides to take it. He then falls into a troubled sleep in which he fights all his enemies, while enduring excruciating side pains. The dream ends with George Stacy's spirit imploring Peter to keep protecting New York as Spider-Man, stating that his powers are both a blessing and a curse. When he wakes up, Peter notices a ghastly thing: he has grown four extra arms. The serum has increased his spider powers rather than nullifying them.

After rejecting an invitation to a movie from Gwen, and a late-night photo assignment from the Daily Bugle, Peter, as Spider-Man, calls Dr. Curt Connors for help, who offers him his summer house as refuge. Elsewhere, Michael Morbius is found stranded in the ocean by a boat and taken aboard, only for numerous passengers to then mysteriously disappear. When the crew confronts him, Morbius attacks them and flees. As night falls and the crew goes to sleep, Morbius, now resembling a vampire, returns and feeds on their blood, but is overwhelmed by guilt and attempts to kill himself by jumping into the ocean. He washes ashore and stumbles upon Connors' summer house, which he enters before falling asleep. Meanwhile, Spider-Man is working on a cure for his condition in Connors' lab in the lower levels of the house and, frustrated, smashes a test tube. Morbius is awakened by the noise and attacks Spider-Man. As the two fight, Connors arrives and the stress of being attacked by Morbius causes him to transform into the Lizard.

Morbius and the Lizard fight over who will kill Spider-Man. Morbius manages to bite the Lizard before escaping. An enzyme in Morbius' blood allows Connors to temporarily regain control of his mind, and he joins forces with Spider-Man to track down Morbius, believing that his blood can help cure them both. Meanwhile, Morbius reflects on how he became a vampire following a failed experiment that he, his fiancée, Martine Bancroft, and his assistant worked on to cure Morbius' rare blood disease; he killed his assistant before jumping into the ocean, not wanting to hurt Martine. As Spider-Man and the Lizard search for Morbius, Gwen and Aunt May worry about Peter, as they haven't heard from him in a while, and J. Jonah Jameson reveals to Robbie Robertson that the Daily Bugle is facing financial problems. Eventually, Spider-Man and the Lizard find Morbius and defeat him, but the vampire ends up falling into the river and disappears. Nonetheless, Spider-Man managed to retrieve a blood sample from him, which he uses to cure both himself and the Lizard.

Other versions

Ultimate Marvel
In the Ultimate Marvel version of Clone Saga, a clone of Spider-Man has six arms and a variant black costume surfaced. When unmasked, this clone is revealed to also have more spider-like physical features, such as fangs around his mouth, additional eyes and spiky hair along his entire face. The variant cover for Ultimate Spider-Man #100 was based on that of The Amazing Spider-Man #100, in which the saga takes place.

Mutant X
In the Mutant X universe, Spider-Man still has six arms. For unexplained reasons, he has taken to calling himself Man-Spider instead of Spider-Man. Moreover, the chemical he consumed apparently altered his DNA, since his clone (who is killed by Madelyne Pryor within the series) also has six arms.

Pestilence
Deadpool encounters a version of Spider-Man in a universe which he refers to as "an Age of Apocalypse" (not the Age of Apocalypse). In this reality, a six-armed Spider-Man becomes Pestilence, Horseman of Apocalypse, with poisonous fangs and engages in cannibalism.

What If?
An issue of What If? had asked "What If Spider-Man had Kept his Six Arms?". Morbius is killed by sharks (they were attracted to the blood on Morbius when he landed in the water) before a cure for Spider-Man's mutation is found. After a fight with the Lizard, Spider-Man is advised by Dr. Curt Connors to see Professor X. Spider-Man ends up in a scuffle with X-Men members Angel, Beast, Cyclops and Iceman until Professor X and Jean Grey break it up. Professor X then examines him with Cerebro and learns that Spider-Man's mutation is permanent. Spider-Man then visits Mister Fantastic for a second opinion. Mister Fantastic also states that the mutation is permanent. When the Thing comes in announcing that Doctor Octopus is holding hostages at City Hall demanding to see Spider-Man, Spider-Man easily takes down Doctor Octopus with his six arms. Spider-Man gains enormous popularity and is the nationally recognized spokesperson for the physically challenged, thereby proving J. Jonah Jameson wrong in his assumption that Spider-Man would be considered as a freak. Afterwards, Mister Fantastic summons Spider-Man back to present his latest invention...four arm sheaths that will keep the extra arms invisible (as long as they are worn) when Peter Parker is in his civilian outfit.

Years later, Aunt May has died of natural causes and Peter begins his full-time career as a superhero. His extra limbs give him augmented strength and agility. Spider-Man also prevented the death of Gwen Stacy at the hands of the Green Goblin as well as participating in the Secret Wars where his alien costume soon resulted in the creation of Venom whom Spider-Man also defeats. The story ends with Peter accepting the situation in which he himself was responsible for and making the best of it.

Spider-Verse
In the run-up to Spider-Verse, after learning that something is crossing dimensions to kill Spider-Men, the Superior Spider-Man (Doctor Octopus' mind in Spider-Man's body) assembles a team of the more ruthless surviving Spider-Men to oppose this threat, including a six-armed Spider-Man wearing a costume perfectly adapted to his condition. During the storyline, this version of Spider-Man accompanies Spider-Man Noir to a world where the spider-bite left Peter in a coma, with the six-armed Spider-Man using the serum that gave him his extra arms to cure Peter of his mutation for good, guessing that Peter's mutation being so new would make it more receptive to the serum. However, the six-armed Spider-Man is later killed during a trip to 2099 with Lady Spider and Spider-Man 2099 when he is caught and fed on by one of the Inheritors.

In other media

Television
 "The Six Arms Saga" is adapted into the Spider-Man: The Animated Series episode "Neogenic Nightmare". In this continuity, the transformation is caused by the same spider-bite that gave Spider-Man his powers and took longer to develop. After the mutation begins, Spider-Man first asks Professor X and the X-Men for aid, but they are unable to help. Spider-Man then turns to Dr. Mariah Crawford instead, but his initial attempt at a cure results in him growing four arms. After fighting the Punisher, Michael Morbius, and the NYPD, the accelerated mutation causes Spider-Man to mutate into the feral "Man-Spider". Kraven the Hunter and Punisher are eventually able to capture Man-Spider and deliver him to Dr. Crawford, who restores him to normal. By the end of the season, the Vulture attempts to drain Spider-Man's youth and power, but Dr. Curt Connors reprograms the Vulture's equipment to absorb the defective genome that originally caused Spider-Man's mutation and permanently cure him, though the genome was temporarily transferred to the Vulture. In the two-part series finale, "Spider Wars", Spider-Man teams up with multiple alternate reality versions of himself assembled by the Beyonder and Madame Web, including a Spider-Man that was still dealing with his mutation crisis who eventually transforms into Man-Spider during their mission. The Beyonder later teleports Man-Spider back to his home dimension so he could receive help.
 The Six Arms Saga is alluded to in Ultimate Spider-Man. In the episode "Strange", Peter Parker dreams that he has four additional arms during his fight with Nightmare within his mind. In "Carnage", Peter imagines a spider-like appearance while he is trying to figure out what his transformation will be after the Green Goblin injects him with the Carnage symbiote. In "The Savage Spider-Man", while traveling to the Savage Land with Wolverine, Spider-Man is poisoned during an encounter with Taskmaster and transforms into the feral Man-Spider before he is eventually cured after Ka-Zar sprays him with liquid from a native Savage Land skunk-like creature and turned back to normal off-screen. In "Return to the Spider-Verse (Pt. 4)", an alternate reality version of Spider-Man resembling Man-Spider is seen among Wolf Spider's captives before the "prime" Spider-Man defeats the latter.

Film
 In November 2017, Sony Pictures announced plans to make a film adaptation of Morbius' origin story from "The Six Arms Saga" as part of Sony's Spider-Man Universe, written by Matt Sazama and Burk Sharpless, directed by Daniel Espinosa, and starring Jared Leto as Dr. Michael Morbius, with Spider-Man removed from the narrative. Production began in November 2018, with filming beginning in February 2019. Morbius was originally scheduled to be released on January 28, 2022, before it was pushed back to April 1, 2022.
 The six-armed Spider-Man will appear in Spider-Man: Across the Spider-Verse as a member of Miguel O'Hara's Spider-Forces.

Video games
The six-armed Spider-Man appears as a playable character in Spider-Man Unlimited.

References

Comics by Roy Thomas
Comics by Stan Lee